In environmental chemistry, the chemical oxygen demand (COD) is an indicative measure of the amount of oxygen that can be consumed by reactions in a measured solution. It is commonly expressed in mass of oxygen consumed over volume of solution which in SI units is milligrams per litre (mg/L). A COD test can be used to easily quantify the amount of organics in water. The most common application of COD is in quantifying the amount of oxidizable pollutants found in surface water (e.g. lakes and rivers) or wastewater. COD is useful in terms of water quality by providing a metric to determine the effect an effluent will have on the receiving body, much like biochemical oxygen demand (BOD).

Overview 
The basis for the COD test is that nearly all organic compounds can be fully oxidized to carbon dioxide with a strong oxidizing agent under acidic conditions. The amount of oxygen required to oxidize an organic compound to carbon dioxide, ammonia, and water is given by:

This expression does not include the oxygen demand caused by nitrification, the oxidation of ammonia into nitrate:

Dichromate, the oxidizing agent for COD determination, does not oxidize ammonia into nitrate, so nitrification is not included in the standard COD test.

The International Organization for Standardization describes a standard method for measuring chemical oxygen demand in ISO 6060 .

Using potassium dichromate
Potassium dichromate is a strong oxidizing agent under acidic conditions. Acidity is usually achieved by the addition of sulfuric acid. The reaction of potassium dichromate with organic compounds is given by:

where . Most commonly, a 0.25 N solution of potassium dichromate is used for COD determination, although for samples with COD below 50 mg/L, a lower concentration of potassium dichromate is preferred.

In the process of oxidizing the organic substances found in the water sample, potassium dichromate is reduced (since in all redox reactions, one reagent is oxidized and the other is reduced), forming Cr3+. The amount of Cr3+ is determined after oxidization is complete, and is used as an indirect measure of the organic contents of the water sample.

Measurement of excess
For all organic matter to be completely oxidized, an excess amount of potassium dichromate (or any oxidizing agent) must be present. Once oxidation is complete, the amount of excess potassium dichromate must be measured to ensure that the amount of Cr3+ can be determined with accuracy. To do so, the excess potassium dichromate is titrated with ferrous ammonium sulfate (FAS) until all of the excess oxidizing agent has been reduced to Cr3+. Typically, the oxidation-reduction indicator ferroin is added during this titration step as well. Once all the excess dichromate has been reduced, the ferroin indicator changes from blue-green to a reddish brown. The amount of ferrous ammonium sulfate added is equivalent to the amount of excess potassium dichromate added to the original sample. Note: Ferroin indicator is bright red from commercially prepared sources, but when added to a digested sample containing potassium dichromate it exhibits a green hue. During the titration the color of the indicator changes from a green hue to a bright blue hue to a reddish brown upon reaching the endpoint. Ferroin indicator changes from red to pale blue when oxidized.

Preparation of ferroin indicator reagent
A solution of 1.485 g 1,10-phenanthroline monohydrate is added to a solution of 695 mg FeSO4·7H2O in distilled water, and the resulting red solution is diluted to 100 mL.

Calculations
The following formula is used to calculate COD:

where b is the volume of FAS used in the blank sample, s is the volume of FAS in the original sample, and n is the normality of FAS. If milliliters are used consistently for volume measurements, the result of the COD calculation is given in mg/L.

The COD can also be estimated from the concentration of oxidizable compound in the sample, based on its stoichiometric reaction with oxygen to yield CO2 (assume all C goes to CO2), H2O (assume all H goes to H2O), and NH3 (assume all N goes to NH3), using the following formula:

COD = (C/FW)·(RMO)·32

Where 
C = Concentration of oxidizable compound in the sample,
FW = Formula weight of the oxidizable compound in the sample,
RMO = Ratio of the # of moles of oxygen to # of moles of oxidizable compound in their reaction to CO2, water, and ammonia

For example, if a sample has 500 Wppm (Weight Parts per Million) of phenol:

C6H5OH + 7O2 → 6CO2 + 3H2O

COD = (500/94)·7·32 = 1191 Wppm

Inorganic interference
Some samples of water contain high levels of oxidizable inorganic materials which may interfere with the determination of COD. Because of its high concentration in most wastewater, chloride is often the most serious source of interference. Its reaction with potassium dichromate follows the equation:

Prior to the addition of other reagents, mercuric sulfate can be added to the sample to eliminate chloride interference.

The following table lists a number of other inorganic substances that may cause interference. The table also lists chemicals that may be used to eliminate such interference, and the compounds formed when the inorganic molecule is eliminated.

Government regulation
Many governments impose strict regulations regarding the maximum chemical oxygen demand allowed in waste water before they can be returned to the environment. For example, in Switzerland, a maximum oxygen demand between 200 and 1000 mg/L must be reached before waste water or industrial water can be returned to the environment .

History
For many years, the strong oxidizing agent potassium permanganate (KMnO4) was used for measuring chemical oxygen demand. Measurements were called oxygen consumed from permanganate, rather than the oxygen demand of organic substances. Potassium permanganate's effectiveness at oxidizing organic compounds varied widely, and in many cases biochemical oxygen demand (BOD) measurements were often much greater than results from COD measurements. This indicated that potassium permanganate was not able to effectively oxidize all organic compounds in water, rendering it a relatively poor oxidizing agent for determining COD.

Since then, other oxidizing agents such as ceric sulphate, potassium iodate, and potassium dichromate have been used to determine COD. Of these, potassium dichromate (K2Cr2O7) has been shown to be the most effective: it is relatively cheap, easy to purify, and is able to nearly completely oxidize almost all organic compounds.

In these methods, a fixed volume with a known excess amount of the oxidant is added to a sample of the solution being analyzed. After a refluxing digestion step, the initial concentration of organic substances in the sample is calculated from a titrimetric or spectrophotometric determination of the oxidant still remaining in the sample. As with all colorimetric methods blanks are used to control for contamination by outside material.

See also
 
 
 
  discusses both BOD and COD as measures of water quality.

References

Citations

Sources

External links 
 ISO 6060: Water quality - Determination of the chemical oxygen demand

Anaerobic digestion
Chemical oceanography
Environmental chemistry
Aquatic ecology
Water quality indicators
Limnology